Roy Bedichek (June 27, 1878 – May 21, 1959) was a Texan writer, naturalist, and educator.

Biography

Early life and education
Roy Bedichek was born on June 27, 1878 in Cass County, Illinois to parents James Madison Bedichek and Lucretia Ellen Craven. The family relocated to Falls County, Texas in 1884. Bedichek attended country schools and the Bedichek Academy, founded by his father in Eddy, Texas. He enrolled at the University of Texas at Austin in February 1898. He received his Bachelor of Science in 1903. Later in 1925, after returning as an employee of the University system, he earned his Master of Arts.

Employment
His first job after college was as a reporter for the Fort Worth Record. Soon after, he was a high school teacher, first in Houston, Texas and then in San Angelo, Texas. Next, he worked as the secretary of the Chamber of Commerce in Deming, New Mexico. While in Deming, he was the Editor of the Deming Headlight. By 1913, Bedichek had returned to Austin and became the secretary of the Young Men's Business League, which later was merged with the chamber of commerce. Subsequently, he was executive secretary of the Organization for Promoting Interest in Higher Education in Texas. Then, he served as city editor of the San Antonio Express.  Finally, in the fall of 1917, he began work in Austin with the University Interscholastic League (UIL), which was then a part of the University of Texas Extension Bureau. He became the second Director of the league in 1922. He retired from this position in 1948.

Writing
At the urging of his friends, Walter Prescott Webb and J. Frank Dobie, he took a leave of absence in February 1946 to write his first book, Adventures with a Texas Naturalist. His second book and third books were awarded the Carr P. Collins Award for the best Texas book of the day by the Texas Institute of Letters (TIL). His last book was released posthumously.

Friends
While his friends J. Frank Dobie and Walter Prescott Webb are more renowned outside of Austin, in the community all three are respected equally. In the late 1960s to the early 1970s, the Austin Independent School District opened Middle Schools (then known as Junior Highs) named after all three men. Also, in 1994 a sculpture, known as Philosopher's Rock, portraying Roy Bedichek, J. Frank Dobie and Walter Prescott Webb was installed at Barton Springs Pool in Austin. The sculpture was fashioned in honor of their promotion of the preservation of Barton Springs.

Media
A documentary, Roy Bedichek's Vanishing Frontier, written, produced and directed by Rob Tranchin was shown nationally on PBS in April 2003.
A one-act play by Steve Moore, Nightswim, about Bedichek, Dobie and Webb was first produced in Austin in Fall, 2004.

Bibliography

 Awarded outstanding Texas book of the year by TIL
 Awarded outstanding Texas book of the year by TIL

References

External links

In Memoriam—Roy Bedichek
A Guide to the Roy Bedichek Papers
Bedichek Middle School—Austin, Texas
Bedichek Families Home Page
Texas Escapes Online Magazine

Further reading

Writers from Texas
Educators from Texas
American environmentalists
American naturalists
1878 births
1959 deaths
University of Texas at Austin alumni
People from Cass County, Illinois
People from Deming, New Mexico